Marius Theiler (born 23 August 1938) is a Swiss sprinter. He won bronze in the men's 4 × 400 metres relay event at the 1962 European Athletics Championships. Two years later, he competed in the men's 4 × 400 metres relay at the 1964 Summer Olympics.

References

1938 births
Living people
Athletes (track and field) at the 1964 Summer Olympics
Swiss male sprinters
Olympic athletes of Switzerland
Place of birth missing (living people)